Joseph R. Koberling Jr. (27 May 1900 – 8 June 1990) was a Hungarian-American architect. Born in Budapest, Hungary, he emigrated to the United States, first to San Francisco, then, in 1917, to Tulsa, Oklahoma where he was a student of noted art teacher, Adah Robinson. He was in the first graduation class of Tulsa Central High School. He was then educated at the Armour Institute (later part of Illinois Institute of Technology) in Chicago, Illinois. He received a Bachelor of Arts in Architecture in 1925. He returned to Tulsa, where he began practicing. He received his Oklahoma license in architecture in 1929, which he maintained until his death.

Although much of his work was done solo, he was a principal in three partnerships in Tulsa:
 Redlich & Koberling, 1929-1931 (F. W. Redlich)
 Fleming & Koberling 1933-1937 (Noble B, Fleming)
 Koberling & Brandborg, 1946-1956 (Lennart Brandborg)

Even while he was working outside a partnership, Koberling collaborated with several other architects on notable projects. These included Frank W. Atkinson, Bruce Goff and Leon Senter.

Notable projects
The table below lists some of the projects in which Koberling participated. He created several houses, especially in Tulsa, which are still in use as private residences. In 1924, before he received his license as an architect, he worked with Bruce Goff on the design of a residence and studio for their high school teacher, Adah Robinson. He is probably best known in architectural circles for his work designing Will Rogers High School in 1936. He is credited with designing what he called, "...101 features that we hoped would make an attractive as well as a functional building." This school, still in use, has been called "... one of the best examples of Art Deco high school architecture...in the United States." Koberling collaborated on the project with Frank Atkinson and Leon Senter. Koberling also designed the 1949 addition to the school.

Koberling played an active role in civic life, as a member of the Kiwanis Club, Tulsa Executive Association, and the Tulsa Chapter of the American Institute of Architects, serving as president of the Tulsa chapter. He was a member of the Tulsa Boys Home.

Death and burial
Koberling died June 8, 1990. His funeral was held at Christ the King Roman Catholic Church in Tulsa. Survivors included a daughter and a grandson. He was buried June 11, 1990 in Rose Hill Memorial Park, Tulsa.

Notes

References

1900 births
1990 deaths
Artists from Tulsa, Oklahoma
Hungarian emigrants to the United States
20th-century American architects
Architects from Oklahoma